The 1961–62 NCAA men's ice hockey season began in November 1961 and concluded with the 1962 NCAA Men's Ice Hockey Tournament's championship game on March 17, 1962 at the Utica Memorial Auditorium in Utica, New York. This was the 15th season in which an NCAA ice hockey championship was held and is the 68th year overall where an NCAA school fielded a team.

This was the premier season for ECAC Hockey which began as a conglomerate of 28 eastern schools among which 8 teams were selected by a committee to participate in a postseason tournament that would determine which university(s) would receive bids to the NCAA tournament. Due to the sheer number of schools and the lack of any scheduling criteria the teams played a vastly unbalanced schedule. As a result, the regular season standings were effectively immaterial in determining the conference tournament participants and the committee based their selections on which teams they felt were the best representatives.

Despite already being in the Tri-State League Clarkson, Rensselaer and St. Lawrence were also founding members of ECAC Hockey and played concurrently in both conferences until the Tri-State League folded in 1972.

This was the first season for Minnesota–Duluth as a university sponsored program.

Regular season

Season tournaments

Standings

1962 NCAA Tournament

Note: * denotes overtime period(s)

Player stats

Scoring leaders
The following players led the league in points at the conclusion of the season.

GP = Games played; G = Goals; A = Assists; Pts = Points; PIM = Penalty minutes

Leading goaltenders
The following goaltenders led the league in goals against average at the end of the regular season while playing at least 33% of their team's total minutes.

GP = Games played; Min = Minutes played; W = Wins; L = Losses; OT = Overtime/shootout losses; GA = Goals against; SO = Shutouts; SV% = Save percentage; GAA = Goals against average

Awards

NCAA

WCHA

ECAC

References

External links
College Hockey Historical Archives
1961–62 NCAA Standings

 
NCAA